The Ghost Talks is a 1929 comedy genre film, directed by Lewis Seiler; based on a Max Marcin and Edward Hammond's Broadway play. Actor Stepen Fetchit played a character named "Christopher Lee" in this early horror film.

According to the New York Times review, this was the second all-talking feature from Fox, featuring various plot devices, like a lisping heroine, to show off the technology. This film is regarded as lost.

Cast
 Helen Twelvetrees
 Charles Eaton
 Carmel Myers
 Stepin Fetchit
 Earle Foxe
 Joe E. Brown
 Arnold Lucy
 Bess Flowers
 Dorothy McGowan
 Mickey Bennett

References

External links

New York Times review

1929 films
American black-and-white films
Films directed by Lewis Seiler
Fox Film films
1929 comedy films
American films based on plays
American comedy films
Lost American films
1929 lost films
Lost comedy films
1920s English-language films
1920s American films